Night Frost is a novel by R. D. Wingfield in the popular series featuring Detective Inspector Jack Frost, coarse, crude, slapdash – and holder of the George Cross. The novel was filmed for the ITV detective series A Touch of Frost.

Plot introduction
A serial killer is terrorizing the senior citizens of Denton, and the local police are succumbing to a flu epidemic. Tired and demoralized, the force has to contend with a seemingly perfect young couple suffering arson attacks and death threats, a suspicious suicide, burglaries, pornographic videos, poison-pen letters...

In uncertain charge of the investigations is Detective Inspector Jack Frost, crumpled, slapdash and foul-mouthed as ever. He tries to cope despite inadequate back-up, but there is never enough time; the unsolved crimes pile up and the vicious killings go on. So Frost has to cut corners and take risks, knowing that his divisional commander will throw him to the wolves if anything goes wrong. And for Frost, things always go wrong...

Release details
1992, UK, Constable, Pub date ? March 1992, hardback (First edition)
1992, UK, Corgi Books, Pub date ? December 1992, paperback 
1993, UK, Magna Large Print Books, Pub date ? December 1993, hardback 
1995, USA, Crimeline, Bantam Books, Pub date ? May 1995, paperback 
1997, UK, Corgi Adult, Pub date ? January 1997, paperback 
1998, UK, ISIS Audio Books, Pub date ? March 1998, audio book (Complete & Unabridged)
2000, UK, ISIS Audio Books, Pub date ? August 2000, audio book
2005, UK, Corgi Books, Pub date ? July 2005, audio book

1992 novels
British crime novels
Constable & Robinson books
British novels adapted into television shows